Reedham railway station is in the south of Purley in the London Borough of Croydon on the Tattenham Corner line. The local area is residential and the station is near the A23 Brighton Road. The Brighton Main Line is adjacent, but is not served by this station.

Although occasionally referred to as Reedham (London), it is most commonly suffixed as Reedham (Surrey) (despite not officially being part of Surrey county since the creation of the London borough of Croydon in 1965) in order to distinguish it from the station of the same name in Norfolk. Its three-letter station code is RHM.

History 

The station was opened by the South Eastern and Chatham Railway on its branch line to Tattenham Corner as Reedham Halt on 1 March 1911. It took its name from the nearby Reedham Asylum for Fatherless Children, founded in Richmond by philanthropist Andrew Reed in 1844. The asylum was renamed Reedham Orphanage in 1904 and Reedham School in 1950. It closed in 1980, but the trust which ran it still occupies the original lodge (gatehouse) of the estate.

After a period of temporary wartime closure between 1917 and 1919, the halt became a station on 5 July 1936. Some timetables used to refer to the station as "Reedham (GLC)". Having first been lengthened in advance of electrification of the line in 1928, the platforms were again extended in 1982 to take eight-car trains in the days when a train had both a driver and a guard. However nowadays, due to lack of station CCTV to assist the driver to close the doors safely, trains without train-mounted external cameras are only permitted to open the doors on the first four carriages.

A new passenger footbridge was installed in late 2013, removing the existing disabled access; the platforms were also resurfaced. A request for full disabled access was made to Network Rail and declined in 2014.

It has Croydon's lowest passenger count in 2016 and it was the scene of a fatality in 2017. The council car park at Reedham was used as Network Rail's base to replace one of the rail bridges adjacent to the station over Christmas 2016.

The telecommunications mast adjacent to the station was increased in size again in 2017 to 25m from 22.5m inline with the planning permission granted in 2016.

It was initially proposed that from 2018, when the Thameslink Programme is completed, services on this line would be operated with larger 12 car trains offering all day direct services to  via . However, in September 2016, these proposals have been dropped; instead, services on the Tattenham Corner Line are to "remain as Southern South London Metro services with increased capacity as compared to today".

Services 
All services at Reedham  are operated by Southern using  EMUs.

The typical off-peak service in trains per hour is:
 2 tph to 

On Sundays, the service is reduced to hourly and runs between Tattenham Corner and  only. Passengers for London Bridge have to change at Purley.

In May 2018, as part of the Thameslink Programme, the service frequency was increased from 2 to 4 trains per hour, although this has subsequently been reduced back to 2 trains per hour following the COVID-19 pandemic.

Connections
London Buses route 455 serves the station. Also, Routes 60, 166, 405, 434, 466 and Night Route N68 stop within a 2-5 minute walk from the station

References

Notes

Sources

External links 

 The Reedham Trust and old map of 

Railway stations in the London Borough of Croydon
Former South Eastern Railway (UK) stations
Railway stations in Great Britain opened in 1911
Railway stations in Great Britain closed in 1917
Railway stations in Great Britain opened in 1919
Railway stations served by Govia Thameslink Railway